Sphodromantis hyalina is a species of praying mantis found in Gabon, Central African Republic and the Congo River region.

See also
African mantis
List of mantis genera and species

References

hyalina
Mantodea of Africa
Insects described in 1955